The list of ship launches in 1805 includes a chronological list of some ships launched in 1805.


References

1805
Ship launches